Kaj Uldaler (born Kaj Uldahl Christoffersen on 28 November 1906; died 6 April 1987) was a Danish amateur football player. He spent his club career with BK Frem and B.93, scoring 131 goals in 202 games for B.93. He scored 15 goals in 38 internationals for the Denmark national football team from 1927 to 1939. He made his international debut in the 25-anniversary game of the Football Association of Norway, and played his last game in the 50-anniversary tournament of the Danish Football Association.

Honours
Danish Championships: 1922-23 with Frem, 1928–29, 1929–30, 1933–34, 1934–35 and 1938–39 with B 93

References

External links
Danish national team profile

1906 births
1987 deaths
Danish men's footballers
Denmark international footballers
Danish football managers
Boldklubben Frem players
Boldklubben af 1893 players
Association football forwards
Footballers from Copenhagen